Armands Krauliņš (August 16, 1939 - July 1, 2022) was a Latvian basketball coach and Order of the Three Stars recipient.

References

1939 births
2022 deaths
People from Kandava
Latvian basketball coaches
Soviet basketball coaches
Latvian Academy of Sport Education alumni